Gárdos, Gardoş or Gardoš may refer to:

Places

Gardoš, a neighborhood in Belgrade

People
András Gárdos, Hungarian footballer
Florin Gardoş, Romanian footballer
Máriska Gárdos (1885–1973) Hungarian feminist and union organizer
Kariel Gardosh, Hungarian-Israeli cartoonist and illustrator
Robert Gardos, Hungarian-Austrian table tennis player